The khushtar (Chinese: 胡西它尔; Uyghur: خۇشتار, Хуштар, also hushtar or hustar) is a bowed lute from the Uyghur Region, Western China. It has four strings in four courses and is tuned G, D, A, E. 

Sometimes the Khushtar also has sympathetic strings. It is most common among the Uyghur peoples in the Xinjiang province of Western China, especially Urumqi.

Construction

The Khushtar has a body made of staves like a lute or oud. These staves are usually made of mulberry or apricot wood. The soundboard is usually made of pine. The instrument will often have a carving of a bird on the top of the head scroll. The pegs are often made of walnut wood.

Playing technique

The instrument is played upright on the knee, with the curved attachment on the end of the body resting on the knee itself.

See also 

 Setar
 Tembor

External links
 The Stringed Instrument Database

Uyghur musical instruments
Chinese musical instruments